Saket Chaudhary is an Indian screenwriter and director mostly known for 2017 sleeper hit Hindi Medium. He also co-wrote Santosh Sivan's Asoka and is the director of Pyaar Ke Side Effects, released in September 2006.

Early life and career
Chaudhary originally wanted to be an Engineer, but changed his focus to Media & Communications when he attended the Department of Media & Communication Studies (DMCS), Savitribai Phule Pune University (SPPU). After graduation, he wrote various television series and worked as assistant director to Aziz Mirza on Phir Bhi Dil Hai Hindustani (2000). Santosh Sivan was the Cinematographer and offered Chaudhary a chance to help him write the screenplay for his upcoming film Asoka.

Chaudhary ventured into direction himself after seeing Farhan Akhtar's Dil Chahta Hai (2001). The film inspired him to pen the screenplay for his directorial debut Pyaar Ke Side Effects (2006). Chaudhary followed it with a sequel, Shaadi Ke Side Effects (2014). He next directed Hindi Medium with Irrfan Khan in the lead role. He is working on an untitled project produced by Sajid Nadiadwala with Alia Bhatt in the main lead.

Filmography

Director

Writer

References

External links

Indian male screenwriters
Hindi-language film directors
Living people
Year of birth missing (living people)
Place of birth missing (living people)
Film directors from Delhi
21st-century Indian film directors
International Indian Film Academy Awards winners